is a passenger railway station located in the village of Nishiawakura, Aida District, Okayama Prefecture, Japan. It is operated by the third-sector semi-public railway operator Chizu Express.

Lines
Nishi-Awakura Station is served by the Chizu Express Chizu Line and is 37.4 kilometers from the terminus of the line at

Station layout
The station consists of one side platform located on an embankment. There is no station building, but there is a hut-like waiting area on the platform. The station is unattended.

Adjacent stations

|-
!colspan=5|Chizu Express

History
Nishi-Awakura Station opened on December 3, 1994 with the opening of the Chizu Line.

Passenger statistics
In fiscal 2018, the station was used by an average of 5 passengers daily.

Surrounding area
Nishiawakura Village Office
Nishiawakura Village Nishiawakura Junior High School
Nishiawakura Village Nishiawakura Elementary School

See also
List of railway stations in Japan

References

External links 

 Official home page 

Railway stations in Japan opened in 1994
Railway stations in Okayama Prefecture